The Klingon Language Institute (KLI) is an independent organization originally founded in Flourtown, Pennsylvania and now located in Kentucky. Its goal is to promote the Klingon language and culture.

General 
The KLI has members from all over the world. For 13 years, it published a quarterly journal  (Klingon for "linguistics"), before discontinuing the paper mailings and changing to an electronic version which quickly stopped entirely. It also published the fiction and poetry magazine  for three volumes. It now publishes a number of translated works including The Wizard of Oz, The Art of War, the Tao Teh Ching, Gilgamesh, Much Ado About Nothing and more. The KLI is running several projects, including the administration of the Duolingo Klingon language course, translation into Klingon of a number of award-winning science fiction short stories, books of the Bible, and works by Shakespeare. The motto of the institute is "", which means "Language opens worlds".

The KLI is a 501(c)3 nonprofit corporation and exists to facilitate the scholarly exploration of the Klingon language and culture. It has the permission of CBS Studios to use trademarks such as "Star Trek" and "Klingon".

History 
The KLI was founded in 1992 in Flourtown, Pennsylvania. In 2022, it relocated to Kentucky.

Each year, in midsummer, the annual meeting called the  takes place. It is open to anyone who is interested in the Klingon language, and usually takes place in the United States. The eighth meeting, the first and only ever outside the US, was held in Brussels, Belgium in 2001 and organized by Lieven Litaer. At these meetings, attendees discuss and use the Klingon language in both formal lessons and panels, as well as informal activities and events. It is held at a more professional level compared to a standard science fiction convention. During the coronavirus pandemic of 2020-21, the KLI held the  online on their Discord server. These events have had some of the highest attendee rates, with the 28th  having over 100 participants. Parallel to this annual meeting, many members of the KLI also organize their own "small meetings", in Klingon called "," which are informal and small local gatherings to practice the Klingon language.

Its name is Earthlings: Ugly Bags of Mostly Water. This movie was presented at the Cannes Film Festival in France, and was shown in theaters few years after.

Organization 
The KLI was founded by Lawrence M. Schoen, Ph.D., who currently still serves on the Bord of Directors. The Board is currently made up of Chris Lipscombe, board president and IT Coordinator, Jeremy Cowan, Vice President and  Coordinator, Alan Anderson, Treasurer and primary Grammarian, and Lawrence M. Schoen, Ph.D., Licensing and Publications Officer.

During the 1990s and 2000s, at intervals ranging from three to eighteen months, a Beginners Grammarian was elected from among the most experienced intermediate level speakers on the  mailing list operated by the KLI. Their duty was to help teach the beginners of the Klingon language who used the email discussion list. The process was designed to help new students of the language while also helping improve the knowledge and skills of the Beginners' Grammarian. When their duty was over, they kept their title of Beginners' Grammarian. The KLI has about 20 former Beginners' Grammarians. Due to the rise of social media and the decline of email discussion lists, Beginners' Grammarians are no longer chosen.

The KLI administers a website, the Klingon Language Certification Program, that is designed to recognize KLI members for their achievements in learning Klingon. The program defines four levels of certification, from Beginner ("") to Grammarian (""). Certification is awarded based upon performance on written tests, administered by representatives of the KLI. Testing is available for free to all active KLI members. Currently only the first three levels have a test, and no one has been awarded the  level as of 2021. Beginners' Grammarians from the email list are not considered . In 2022 the KLI entered a partnership with Duolingo to run their Klingon language course.

The KLI is in close contact with Marc Okrand, the creator of the Klingon language, who has visited each  since the third one. At those meetings, he receives a wishlist of requests for missing Klingon vocabulary, which he frequently answers.

Notable speakers 
Some Klingonists have gained relative notoriety for various accomplishments. The KLI has awarded the title "Friend of Maltz" to Klingonists who has furthered the language in various significant ways. This award has only been given out to twelve people since the formation of the KLI. Its recipients include: Alan Anderson, William Martin, Mark Shoulson, Rich Yampell, d'Armond Speers, Nick Nicholas, Robyn Stewart, Eric Andeen, Jeremy Cowan, Chris Lipscombe and Lieven L. Litaer

Rich Yampell 
He is the author of the book The Grammarian's Desk, published in 1996 by the Klingon Language Institute, a collection of the columns he wrote for the institute's scholarly journal HolQeD. Yampell is also the author and co-author of numerous songs, such as the Klingon Anthem "" (music and lyrics), "" (music and lyrics), "" (music). He served as the KLI's Primary Grammarian from its founding until 2022.

Lawrence M. Schoen 

Lawrence M. Schoen is the founder of the KLI and former Director. He is the editor of the institute's scholarly journal  and co-creator of the Klingon song "" (lyrics).

He obtained a bachelor's degree in Psycholinguistics from California State University, Northridge, and then master's and doctoral degrees in cognitive psychology from Kansas State University. He has worked as a professor, teaching and doing research, at New College of Florida, Lake Forest College, Chestnut Hill College, and West Chester University. More recently he serves as the director of research and chief compliance officer for the Wedge Medical Center.

He is also a professional science fiction author, a lifetime member of SFWA, and in 2007 was a finalist for the John W. Campbell Award for Best New Writer.

He resides in Blue Bell, Pennsylvania.

Chris Lipscombe 
Lipscombe is the current board President and IT Directory.

He performs the day-to-day administration of the KLI, including maintaining the website, fulfilling merchandise, overseeing the mailing list, and Discord server. Chris has completed many Klingon translations projects, the largest of which was the translation of A Klingon Christmas Carol, and served as the original language coach for the Chicago productions of the play. He also worked on translations for the TV show The Big Bang Theory, the movie Please Stand By, various Klingon Pop Warrior songs, the Minecraft client, and many others. He resides in Kentucky, the current headquarters for the KLI.

Alan Anderson 
Anderson is the current board Treasurer and primary Grammarian.

He oversees the KLI's online event calendar and runs a weekly Klingon language discussion on the KLI's Discord server. He has also served as a Beginners Grammarian on the KLI's mailing list. He is one of the most skilled Klingon speakers on the planet. He has worked on a number of translation projects, including Star Trek: Discovery, IDW's Blood Will Tell comic, Marvel Comics' Starfleet Academy #18 Klingon Language edition, and the April Fools webpage and video of Mount Vernon. He also provides voices for the Duolingio Klingon language course.

Jeremy Cowan 
Cowan is the current board Vice President and  Coordinator.

He was part of the team the originally created the Duolingo Klingon language course and currently oversees the KLI's partnership with Duolingo. He has been a member of the KLI since 1992 and attended the Klingon Language Camp in Red Lake Falls, MN. He has served as the language coach for the Chicago productions of A Klingon Christmas Carol, taking over from Chris 2012.

d'Armond Speers 
Speers is an American computational linguist and a former member of the KLI.

He graduated from Georgetown University in the Spring of 2002. His dissertation topic was "Representation of American Sign Language for Machine Translation".

Speers is known for having undertaken the endeavor to raise his child bilingually in English and Klingon; Speers spoke in Klingon and his wife in English. A few years into his life, the child began rejecting Klingon and gravitating towards English, as he could use English with many more speakers. At the time of Speers' attempt, Klingon even lacked words for many objects common around the house, such as "table". The experiment ultimately failed when the child refused to use Klingon when he got older, and Speers abandoned the project in 1997.

Publications 
 HolQeD, the quarterly journal of the KLI containing grammatical discussions, new Klingon words, Klingon literature as well as internal information for the members. [Ceased publication ca. 2003]
 A Pictorial Guide to the Verbal Suffixes of tlhIngan Hol (1995) [no longer available in printed form, but is available as an Ebook] A book with drawings explaining the use of different suffixes.
 ghIlghameS (2000). The Klingon version of the Epic of Gilgamesh, translated by Roger Cheesbro, with an introduction by Lawrence M. Schoen.
 The Klingon Hamlet (full title: The Tragedy of Khamlet, Son of the Emperor of Qo'noS) The Klingon translation of Shakespeare's most famous work, translated by Nick Nicholas and Andrew Strader supported by the KLI. This project was initiated after the Klingon Chancellor Gorkon (David Warner) stated in Star Trek VI: The Undiscovered Country, "You have not experienced Shakespeare until you have read him in the original Klingon." The KLI printed and published a limited edition hardback version in 1996, entitled Hamlet Prince of Denmark: The Restored Klingon Version. Star Trek publisher Pocket Books published the work as a trade paperback in 2000.
 Much Ado about Nothing in Klingon (2003). Translated by Nick Nicholas.
 From the Grammarian's Desk [no longer available] A collection of grammatical wisdom from the HolQeD column by Captain Krankor, the first grammarian of the KLI.
 Tao Te Ching (2008). A Klingon translation and a new English translation of Lao Tzu's classic, by Agnieszka Solska, published as a trade paperback and a hardcover version.
 Sunzi's Art of War (2018).
 The Wonderful Wizard of Oz. A Klingon translation of the L. Frank Baum book by Jackson Bradley, published as a trade paperback. 
  (2021). An original Klingon novel, the first of its kind to be published, by Jackson Bradley. Published as a trade paperback.

Collaborations 
Having some of the most experienced Klingon speakers, the KLI is often contacted for or involved in translations before they are published. This work may include reviews or even complete translation work.

 Star Trek: Starfleet Academy series ! (1998)
A Star Trek comic by Marvel Comics was translated by Alan Anderson and David Trimboli, coordinated by Lawrence Schoen, and edited by Chip Carter.

 Star Trek: Klingons - "Blood Will Tell" (2007)
The production of the comic publisher IDW was translated by KLI members Alan Anderson, Roger Cheesbro, Rich Yampell and Lawrence M. Schoen.

 Klingon Monopoly (2011)
The Klingon version of the board game Monopoly was translated by Marc Okrand and the KLI.

  (2011)
The book for the opera ʼuʼ was reviewed before publication.

 Klingon Manual of the Bird of Prey (2013)
A book about a Klingon space ship was reviewed before publication.

 How to Speak Klingon (2013)
This audio phrase book with Klingon daily-use sentences was translated by the KLI and the audio samples were spoken by its director, Lawrence M. Schoen.

 Star Trek: Manifest Destiny (2016)
The production of the comic publisher IDW was translated by KLI members Roger Cheesbro, Chris Lipscombe, and Jeremy Cowan.

 Star Trek Online: Steel and Flame (2021)
This rock song written by Jason Charles Miller and sung by Mary Chieffo, (who played L'Rell in Star Trek: Discovery) was translated by KLI members, primarily Chris Lipscombe.

 Baby's First Klingon Words (2022)
A board book by Insight Editions that contains pictures and words in both Klingon and English.

References

External links 

 Website of the KLI (www.kli.org/)
 
 Earthlings: Ugly Bags of Mostly Water, Amazon

1992 establishments in Pennsylvania
2022 establishments in Kentucky
Klingon language
Organizations based in Kentucky
Organizations established in 1992